Gary Batchelor is a Canadian former international soccer player.

References

Year of birth missing (living people)
Living people
Canadian soccer players
Canada men's international soccer players
Association footballers not categorized by position